The rugby sevens competition at the 2018 South American Games was held in Colcapirhua, Bolivia from 27 to 29 May at the Estadio Municipal de Colcapirhua.

Participating teams

Men

Women

Medal summary

Medal table

Men's tournament

All times are local (UTC−04:00).

Women's tournament

All times are local (UTC−04:00).

References

External links
2018 South American Games – Rugby sevens

2018 South American Games events
South American Games
2018
Qualification tournaments for the 2019 Pan American Games
2018 South American Games